Ian Sales is a British science fiction writer, editor and founder of the SF Mistressworks website. Although born in the UK, he grew up in the Middle-East, in Qatar, Oman, Dubai and Abu Dhabi.

Biography
In the 1990s he was joint editor of The Lyre science-fiction magazine, which published work by authors such as Eric Brown, Stephen Baxter, Gwyneth Jones and Peter F Hamilton.

In 2012, he edited the anthology Rocket Science for Mutation Press. One of the non-fiction articles in the anthology, 'The Complexity of the Humble Spacesuit' by Karen Burnham was nominated for the BSFA Award in the non-fiction category.

His self-published novella Adrift on the Sea of Rains, the first book of the Apollo Quartet, was described by the Guardian national newspaper as "one of the most outstanding self-published books of the year". It won the 2012 BSFA Award in the short fiction category, and was a finalist for the 2012 Sidewise Award for Alternate History Best Short-Form. The second book of the quartet, The Eye With Which The Universe Beholds Itself, was published in early 2013, and the third book, Then Will The Great Ocean Wash Deep Above, in late 2013. The final book of the quartet, a novel titled All That Outer Space Allows, was published in April 2015, and was selected for the James Tiptree, Jr Award honor list in April 2016. Also published in April 2015 was the first book of a space opera trilogy, A Prospect of War. It was followed by A Conflict of Orders in October 2015, and A Want of Reason is due in 2016.

Bibliography 
 Rocket Science. Glasgow: Mutation Press, 2012. 
 Aphrodite Terra: Stories About Venus, Sheffield: Whippleshield Books, 2015. 
 Dreams of the Space Age, Sheffield: Whippleshield Books, 2015. 
 Apollo Quartet
  Adrift on the Sea of Rains. Sheffield: Whippleshield Books, 2012. 
 The Eye With Which The Universe Beholds Itself. Sheffield: Whippleshield Books, 2013. 
 Then Will The Great Ocean Wash Deep Above. Sheffield: Whippleshield Books, 2013. 
 All That Outer Space Allows. Sheffield: Whippleshield Books, 2015. 
 An Age of Discord
 A Prospect of War. North Blyth: Tickety Boo Press, 2015. 
 A Conflict of Orders. North Blyth: Tickety Boo Press, 2015.

References

External links
 Author Bio

 Encyclopedia of Science Fiction entry
 SF Mistressworks
 Paul Cornell discusses Adrift on the Sea of Rains in Episode 23: A Squishy Little Shield on SF Squeecast
 Rocket Science review in The Guardian by 
 Adrift on the Sea of Rains review on Tor.com by 
 Adrift on the Sea of Rains included amongst "top choices" in The Guardian by 
 The story behind All That Outer Space Allows - Online Essay written by Ian Sales

21st-century British novelists
Living people
British science fiction writers
Year of birth missing (living people)
British male novelists